This is a list of men's association football clubs in Spain. Currently the governing body of football in Spain is the Royal Spanish Football Federation (RFEF), which is in charge of its national teams and its leagues, with the highest one being La Liga. RFEF was founded in 1909 and is a member of both FIFA and UEFA.

La Liga

La Liga teams 2022–23 season

Segunda División

Segunda División teams 2022–23 season

Primera División RFEF

Primera División RFEF teams 2022–23 season

Group 1

Group 2

Segunda División RFEF

Segunda División RFEF teams 2022–23 season

Group 1

Group 2

Group 3

Group 4

Group 5

Tercera División RFEF

Tercera División RFEF teams 2021–22 season

Group 1 -  Galicia

Group 2 -  Asturias

Group 3 -  Cantabria

Group 4 -  Basque Country

Group 5 -  Catalonia

Group 6 -  Valencian Community

Group 7 -  Community of Madrid

Group 8 -  Castile and León

Group 9 -  Eastern Andalusia and  Melilla

Group 10 -  Western Andalusia and  Ceuta

Group 11 -  Balearic Islands

Group 12 -  Canary Islands

Group 13 -  Region of Murcia

Group 14 -  Extremadura

Group 15 -  Navarre

Group 16 -  La Rioja

Group 17 -  Aragon

Group 18 -  Castilla–La Mancha

Women's

Primera División Femenina teams 2021–22 season

See also
List of football teams in the Province of Seville

Notes

References

Spain
 
clubs
Football